A chronic electrode implant is an electronic device implanted chronically (for a long period) into the brain or other electrically excitable tissue. It may record electrical impulses in the brain or may stimulate neurons with electrical impulses from an external source.

Clinical applications and direction

Clinical applications for brain computer interfaces (BCI) 
The potential for neural interfacing technology to restore lost sensory or motor function is staggering; victims of paralysis due to peripheral nerve injury could achieve a full recovery by directly recording the output of their motor cortex, but the technology is immature and unreliable. There are numerous examples in the literature of intra-cortical electrode recording used to a variety of ends that fail after a few weeks, a few months at best. This document will review the current state of research into electrode failure, focusing on recording electrodes as opposed to stimulating electrodes.

Direction for development of Chronic BCI 
Chronic brain-computer interfaces come in two varieties, stimulating and recording. Applications for stimulating interfaces include sensory prosthetics (cochlear implants), for example, are the most successful variety of sensory prosthetics) and deep brain stimulation therapies, while recording interfaces can be used for research applications and to record the activity of speech or motor centers directly from the brain. In principle these systems are susceptible to the same tissue response that causes failure in implanted electrodes, but stimulating interfaces can overcome this problem by increasing signal strength. Recording electrodes, however, must rely on whatever signals are present where they are implanted, and cannot easily be made more sensitive.

Current implantable microelectrodes are unable to record single- or multi-unit activity reliably on a chronic scale. Lebedev & Nicolelis discuss in their 2006 review the specific needs for research in the field to truly improve the technology to the level of clinical implementation. In short, the 4 requirements outlined in their review are:
 1) Consistent long term (over the course of years) recording of large neuronal populations residing in multiple brain areas;
 2) Efficient computational processing of recorded data; 
 3) Incorporation of feedback into the user’s body image using native plasticity; 
 4) Advances in prosthetic technology to create artificial limbs capable of reproducing the full range of motion.

This review will focus on techniques pursued in the literature that are relevant to achieving the goal of consistent, long-term recordings. Research towards this end can be divided into two primary categories: characterizing the specific causes of recording failure, and techniques for preventing or delaying electrode failure.

Interaction between electrode and tissue 
As mentioned above, if there is to be significant progress towards long-term implantable electrodes, an important step is documenting the response of living tissue to electrode implantation in both the acute and chronic timelines. It is ultimately this tissue response that causes electrodes to fail by encapsulating the electrode itself in a protective layer called a “glial scar,” (see 2.2). One serious impediment to understanding the tissue response is the lack of true standardization of implantation technique or of electrode materials. Common materials for electrode or probe construction include silicon, platinum, iridium, polyimide, ceramic, gold, as well as others. In addition to the variety of materials used, electrodes are constructed in many different shapes, including planar shanks, simple uniform microwires, and probes that taper to a thin tip from a wider base. Implantable electrode research also employs many different techniques for surgically implanting the electrodes; the most critical differences are whether or not the implant is anchored across the skull and the speed of insertion. The overall observed tissue response is caused by a combination of the traumatic injury of electrode insertion and the persistent presence of a foreign body in the neural tissue.

Defining and minimizing acute term effects of electrode insertion 
Damage caused by electrodes in the short term is caused by the insertion into the tissue. Consequently, research into minimizing this is focused on the geometry of the electrode and the proper technique for insertion. Short term effects of electrode insertion on surrounding tissue have been documented extensively. They include cell death (both neuronal and glial), severed neuronal processes and blood vessels, mechanical tissue compression, and collection of debris resulting from cell death.

In the Bjornsson et al. 2006 study, an ex vivo apparatus was constructed explicitly to study the deformation of and damage to neural tissue during electrode insertion. Electrodes were constructed from silicon wafers to have three different sharpnesses (interior angle of 5° for sharp, 90° for medium, 150° for blunt). Insertion speed was also presented at three speeds, 2 mm/s, 0.5 mm/s, and 0.125 mm/s. Qualitative assessments of vascular damage were made by taking real-time images of electrodes being inserted into 500 um thick coronal brain slices. To facilitate direct visualization of vascular deformation, tissue was labeled with fluorescent dextran and microbeads before viewing. The fluorescent dextran filled the blood vessels, allowing initial geometry to be visualized along with any distortions or breakages. Fluorescent microbeads lodged throughout the tissue, providing discrete coordinates that aided in computerized calculations of strain and deformation. Analysis of the images prompted the division of tissue damage into 4 categories:
 1) fluid displacement,
 2) vessel rupture,
 3) vessel severing, and
 4) vessel dragging.
Fluid displacement by device insertion frequently resulted in ruptured vessels. Severing and dragging were consistently present along the insertion track, but did not correlate with tip geometry. Rather, these features were correlated with insertion speed, being more prevalent at medium and slow insertion speeds. Faster insertion of sharp probes was the only condition resulting in no reported vascular damage.

Tissue response to chronic-term electrode implantation 
When implanted in neural tissue in the long term, microelectrodes stimulate a sort of foreign body response, primarily effected by astrocytes and microglia. Each cell-type performs many functions in supporting healthy, uninjured neural tissue, and each is also ‘activated’ by injury related mechanisms that result in changes in morphology, expression profile, and function. Tissue response has also been shown to be greater in situation where the electrodes are anchored through the subject’s skull; the tethering forces aggravate the injury caused by the electrode’s insertion and sustain the tissue response.

One function taken on by microglia when activated is to cluster around foreign bodies and degrade them enzymatically. It has been proposed that when the foreign body cannot be degraded, as in the case of implanted electrodes whose material composition is resistant to such enzymatic dissolution, this ‘frustrated phagocytosis’ contributes to the failure of recordings, releasing necrotic substances into the immediate vicinity and contributing to cell death around the electrode.

Activated astrocytes form the major component of the encapsulating tissue that forms around implanted electrodes. “Current theories hold that glial encapsulation, i.e. gliosis, insulates the electrode from nearby neurons, thereby hindering diffusion and increasing impedance, extends the distance between the electrode and its nearest target neurons, or creates an inhibitory environment for neurite extension, thus repelling regenerating neural processes away from recording sites”. Either activated astrocytes or buildup of cellular debris from cell death around the electrode would act to insulate the recording sites from other, active neurons. Even very small increases in the separation between the electrode and local nerve population can insulate the electrode completely, as electrodes must be within 100 µm to get a signal.

Another recent study addresses the problem of the tissue response. Michigan-type electrodes (see article for detailed dimensions) were surgically inserted into the brains of Adult male Fischer 344 rats; a control population was treated with the same surgical procedures, but the electrode was implanted and immediately removed so that a comparison could be made between tissue response to acute injury and chronic presence. Animal subjects were sacrificed at 2 and 4 weeks after implantation to quantify the tissue response with histological and immunostaining techniques. Samples were stained for ED1 and GFAP presence. ED1+ reading is indicative of the presence of macrophages, and was observed in a densely packed region within approximately 50 µm of the electrode surface. ED1+ cells were present at both 2 and 4 weeks after implantation, with no significant difference between the time points. Presence of GFAP indicates presence of reactive astrocytes, and was seen at 2 and 4 weeks after implantation, extending more than 500 µm from the electrode surface. Stab controls showed signs of inflammation and reactive gliosis as well, however signals were significantly lower in intensity than those found in chronic test subjects, and diminished noticeably from 2 weeks to 4 weeks. This is strong evidence that glial scarring and the encapsulation, and eventual isolation, of implanted microelectrodes is primarily a result of chronic implantation, and not the acute injury.

Another recent study addressing the impact of chronically implanted electrodes points that tungsten-coated electrodes seem to be well tolerated by the nervous tissue, inducing a small and circumscribed inflammatory response only in the vicinity of the implant, associated with a small cell death .

Developing methods to alleviate chronic effects 
Techniques for combating long-term failure of electrodes are understandably focused on disarming the foreign body response. This can most obviously be achieved by improving the biocompatibility of the electrode itself, thus reducing the tissue’s perception of the electrode as a foreign substance. As a result, much of the research towards alleviating the tissue response is focused on improved biocompatibility.

It is difficult to effectively evaluate progress towards improved electrode biocompatibility because of the variety of research in this field.

Improving biocompatibility of recording electrodes 
This section loosely categorizes different approaches to improving biocompatibility seen in the literature. Descriptions of the research are limited to a brief summary of the theory and technique, not the results, which are presented in detail in the original publications. Thus far, no technique has achieved results drastic and sweeping enough to change the fact of the encapsulation response.

Biological coating 
Research focusing on bioactive coatings to alleviate the tissue response is conducted primarily on silicon-based electrodes. Techniques include the following:
 storing anti-inflammatory neuropeptide α-MSH under a layer of nitrocellulose or within a nitrocellulose matrix to be released gradually into the local tissue post-implantation; 
 coating electrodes with alternating layers of polyethylimine (PEI) and laminin (LN), with the objective of the outer LN layer decreasing the tissue response by helping to disguise the electrode as native material; 
 coating electrodes with a conductive polymer film to improve electrical characteristics, overcoming the encapsulation barrier by increasing electrode sensitivity.

Protein functionalization 
Another body of research dedicated to improving the biocompatibility of electrodes focuses on functionalizing the electrode surface with relevant protein sequences. Studies have demonstrated that surfaces functionalized with sequences taken from adhesive peptides will decrease cellular motility and support higher neuronal populations.
It has also been shown that peptides can be selected to specifically support neuronal growth or glial growth, and that peptides can be deposited in patterns to guide cellular outgrowth. If populations of neurons can be induced to grow onto inserted electrodes, electrode failure should be minimized.

Electrode design 
Kennedy’s research details the use of a glass cone electrode which contains a microwire built inside of it. The microwire is used for recording, and the cone is filled with neurotrophic substances or neural tissue in order to promote growth of local neurons into the electrode to allow for recording. This approach overcomes tissue response by encouraging neurons to grow closer to recording surface.

Microfluid delivery 
Some notable success has also been made in developing microfluid delivery mechanisms that could ostensibly deliver targeted pharmacological agents to electrode implantation sites to alleviate the tissue response.

Research tools being developed 
Just as in other fields, some effort is devoted explicitly to the development of standardized research tools. The goal of these tools is to provide a powerful, objective way of analyzing the failure of chronic neural electrodes in order to improve the reliability of the technology.

One such effort describes the development of an in vitro model to study the tissue response phenomenon. Midbrains are surgically removed from day 14 Fischer 344 rats and grown in culture to create a confluent layer of neurons, microglia, and astrocytes. This confluent layer can be used to study the foreign body response by scrape-injury or depositing electrode microwires on the monolayer, fixing the culture at defined time points after insertion/injury and studying tissue response with histological methods.
 
Another research tool is a numerical model of the mechanical electrode-tissue interface. The goal of this model is not to detail the electrical or chemical characteristics of the interface, but the mechanical ones created by electrode-tissue adhesion, tethering forces, and strain mismatch. This model can be used to predict forces generated at the interface by electrodes of different material stiffnesses or geometries.

For studies requiring a massive quantity of identical electrodes, a bench-top technique has been demonstrated in the literature to use a silicon shape as a master to produce multiple copies out of polymeric materials via a PDMS intermediate. This is exceptionally useful for material studies or for labs who need a high volume of electrodes but cannot afford to buy them all.

See also
Auditory brainstem implant
Brain implant

References 
 Arosarena, O., Tissue Engineering. Current Opinion in Otolaryngology & Head and Neck Surgery, 2005. 13: p. 9.
 Lebedev, M.A., Brain–machine interfaces: past, present and future. Trends in Neurosciences, 2006. 29(9): p. 11.
 Kipke, D.R., Silicon-Substrate Intracortical Microelectrode Arrays for Long-Term Recording of Neuronal Spike Activity in Cerebral Cortex. IEEE TransACTIONS ON NEURAL SYSTEMS AND REHABILITATION ENGINEERING, 2003. 11(2): p. 5.
 Marzullo, T.C., C.R. Miller, and D.R. Kipke, Suitability of the cingulate cortex for neural control. IEEE Transactions on Neural Systems and Rehabilitation Engineering, 2006. 14(4): p. 401-409.
 Nicolelis, M.A.L., Reconstructing the Engram: Simultaneous, Multisite, Many Single Neuron Recordings. Neuron, 1997. 18: p. 9.
Rousche, P.J., Chronic recording capability of the Utah Intracortical Electrode Array in cat sensory cortex. Journal of Neuroscience Methods, 1998. 82: p. 15.
 Santhanam, G., A high-performance brain-computer interface. Nature, 2006. 442: p. 4.
 Schwartz, A.B., Brain-Controlled Interfaces: Movement Restoration with Neural Prosthetics. Neuron, 2006. 52: p. 16.
 Vetter, R.J., Chronic Neural Recording Using Silicon-Substrate Microelectrode Arrays Implanted in Cerebral Cortex. IEEE TransACTIONS ON BIOMEDICAL ENGINEERING, 2004. 51(6): p. 9.
 Williams, J.C., Long-term neural recording characteristics of wire microelectrode arrays implanted in cerebral cortex. Brain Research Protocols, 1999. 4: p. 11.
 Berger, T.W., G. Chauvet, and R.J. Sclabassi, A Biologically-Based Model of Functional Properties of the Hippocampus. Neural Networks, 1994. 7(6-7): p. 1031-1064.
Cheung, K.C., et al., Flexible polyimide microelectrode array for in vivo recordings and current source density analysis. Biosensors & Bioelectronics, 2007. 22(8): p. 1783-1790.
 Moffitt, M.A. and C.C. McIntyre, Model-based analysis of cortical recording with silicon microelectrodes. Clinical Neurophysiology, 2005. 116(9): p. 2240-2250.
 Vince, V., et al., Biocompatibility of platinum-metallized silicone rubber: in vivo and in vitro evaluation. Journal of Biomaterials Science-Polymer Edition, 2004. 15(2): p. 173-188.
Weiland, J.D. and D.J. Anderson, Chronic neural stimulation with thin-film, iridium oxide electrodes. IEEE Transactions on Biomedical Engineering, 2000. 47(7): p. 911-918.
 Westby, G.W.M. and H.Y. Wang, A floating microwire technique for multichannel chronic neural recording and stimulation in the awake freely moving rat. Journal of Neuroscience Methods, 1997. 76(2): p. 123-133.
 Moxon, K.A., et al., Nanostructured surface modification of ceramic-based microelectrodes to enhance biocompatibility for a direct brain-machine interface. IEEE Transactions on Biomedical Engineering, 2004. 51(6): p. 881-889.
Moxon, K.A., et al., Ceramic-based multisite electrode arrays for chronic single-neuron recording. IEEE Transactions on Biomedical Engineering, 2004. 51(4): p. 647-656.
Hoogerwerf, A.C., A Three-Dimensional Microelectrode Array for Chronic Neural Recording. IEEE TransACTIONS ON BIOMEDICAL ENGINEERING, 1994. 41(12): p. 11.
Kim, Y.-T., Chronic response of adult rat brain tissue to implants anchored to the skull. Biomaterials, 2004. 25: p. 9.
Biran, R., Neuronal cell loss accompanies the brain tissue response to chronically implanted silicon microelectrode arrays. Experimental Neurology, 2005. 195: p. 12.
Bjornsson, C.S., Effects of insertion conditions on tissue strain and vascular damage during neuroprosthetic device insertion. Journal of Neural Engineering, 2006. 3: p. 12.
Weldon, D.T., et al., Fibrillar beta-amyloid induces microglial phagocytosis, expression of inducible nitric oxide synthase, and loss of a select population of neurons in the rat CNS in vivo. Journal of Neuroscience, 1998. 18(6): p. 2161-2173.
Polikov, V.S., Response of brain tissue to chronically implanted neural electrodes. Journal of Neuroscience Methods, 2005. 148: p. 18.
Griffith, R.W. and D.R. Humphrey, Long-term gliosis around chronically implanted platinum electrodes in the Rhesus macaque motor cortex. Neuroscience Letters, 2006. 406(1-2): p. 81-86.
Gray, C.M., Tetrodes markedly improve the reliability and yield of multiple single-unit isolation from multi-unit recordings in cat striate cortex. Journal of Neuroscience Methods, 1995. 63: p. 12.
Zhong, Y. and R.V. Bellamkonda, Controlled release of anti-inflammatory agent a-MSH from neural implants. Journal of Controlled Release, 2006. 106: p. 10.
He, W., Nanoscale laminin coating modulates cortical scarring response around implanted silicon microelectrode arrays. Journal of Neural Engineering, 2006. 3: p. 11.
He, W. and R.V. Bellamkonda, Nanoscale neuro-integrative coatings for neural implants. Biomaterials, 2005. 26(16): p. 2983-2990.
Ludwig, K.A., Chronic neural recordings using silicon microelectrode arrays electrochemically deposited with a poly(3,4-ethylenedioxythiophene) (PEDOT) film. Journal of Neural Engineering, 2006: p. 12.
Freire, M.A.M., et al., Comprehensive analysis of tissue preservation and recording quality from chronic multielectrode implants. PLoS One, 2011. 6(11): p. e27554.
Olbrich, K.C., et al., Surfaces modified with covalently-immobilized adhesive peptides affect fibroblast population motility. Biomaterials, 1996. 17(8): p. 759-764.
Stauffer, W.R. and X. Cui, Polypyrrole doped with 2 peptide sequences from laminin. Biomaterials, 2006. 27: p. 9.
Kam, L., et al., Selective adhesion of astrocytes to surfaces modified with immobilized peptides. Biomaterials, 2002. 23(2): p. 511-515.
Lu, S., Receptor-Ligand-Based Specific Cell Adhesion on Solid Surfaces: Hippocampal Neuronal Cells on Bilinker Functionalized Glass. Nano Letters, 2006. 6(9): p. 5.
Saneinejad, S. and M.S. Shoichet, Patterned glass surfaces direct cell adhesion and process outgrowth of primary neurons of the central nervous system. Journal of Biomedical Materials Research, 1998. 42(1): p. 13-19.
Kennedy, P.R., S.S. Mirra, and R.A.E. Bakay, The Cone Electrode - Ultrastructural studies following long-term recording in rat and monkey cortex. Neuroscience Letters, 1992. 142(1): p. 89-94.
Rathnasingham, R., Characterization of Implantable Microfabricated Fluid Delivery Devices. IEEE TransACTIONS ON BIOMEDICAL ENGINEERING, 2004. 51(1): p. 8.
Polikov, V.S., In Vitro model of glial scarring around neuroelectrodes chronically implanted in the CNS. Biomaterials, 2006. 27: p. 9.
Subbaroyan, J., A finite-element model of the mechanical effects of implantable microelectrodes in the cerebral cortex. Journal of Neural Engineering, 2005. 2: p. 11.
Russo, A.P., Microfabricated Plastic Devices from Silicon using Soft Intermediates. Biomedical Microdevices, 2002. 4(4): p. 7.

Implants (medicine)
Neuroprosthetics